Nationality words link to articles with information on the nation's poetry or literature (for instance, Irish or France).

Events
 Maciej Kazimierz Sarbiewski is appointed poeta laureatus by the Pope

Works published

Great Britain
 John Abbot, only two of the five books were published
 Robert Aylet,  [sic], published anonymously
 Samuel Daniel, 
 William Drummond,  (see also A Midnights Trance 1619)
 George Wither, The Hymnes and Songs of the Church, published anonymously; music by Orlando Gibbons; there were several editions this year

Other
 Agrippa d'Aubigné, Nouvelle édition des Tragiques, France
 Michelangelo Buonarroti, Rime di Michelagnolo Buonarroti raccolte da Michelagnolo suo nipote, Florence: Giunti; Italy
 Martin Opitz, Lob des Feldlebens, Germany
 Théophile de Viau, Les Amours tragiques de Pyrame et Thisbé, France

Births
Death years link to the corresponding "[year] in poetry" article:
 Mei Qing (died 1697), Chinese landscape painter, calligrapher, and poet
 Margaret Cavendish, Duchess of Newcastle-upon-Tyne (died 1673), English aristocrat, poet and writer

Deaths
Birth years link to the corresponding "[year] in poetry" article:
 March 29 – Scévole de Sainte-Marthe (born 1536), French poet
 April 21 – Nicolas Coeffeteau (born 1574), French theologian, poet and historian
 July/August – Tulsidas, तुलसीदास, also known as Gosvāmī Tulsīdās and Tulasī Dāsa (born 1532), Awadhi poet and philosopher
 November – Giles Fletcher (born 1586), English poet chiefly known for the allegorical poem Christ's Victory and Triumph
 Gaspar Aguilar (born 1561), Spanish poet and dramatist
 Jean de La Ceppède (born 1548), French poet
 Francesc Vicent Garcia (born 1582), Catalan poet
 Alonso de Ledesma, (born 1552, according to many sources, or 1562, according to many others) Spanish
 Hieronim Morsztyn (born 1581), Polish poet

See also

Poetry

Notes

17th-century poetry
Poetry